Tahar Rahim (born 4 July 1981) is a French actor. His breakthrough performance was in the 2009 French film A Prophet, for which he won the César Award for Best Actor and Most Promising Actor. He has since starred as FBI agent Ali Soufan in the miniseries The Looming Tower and Judas in the film Mary Magdalene (both 2018).

Rahim garnered critical acclaim and nominations for the Golden Globe Award and the BAFTA Award for Best Actor in a Leading Role for portraying Mohamedou Ould Salahi in The Mauritanian (2021). He received another Golden Globe Award nomination for portraying Charles Sobhraj in the miniseries The Serpent (2021).

Early life
Rahim was born in Belfort, France, into a family that had immigrated from the region of Oran, Algeria.

After earning a Baccalauréat at the Lycée Condorcet of Belfort, Rahim enrolled first in sports and then computer science programmes. After two subsequent years of boredom studying the subjects in Strasbourg and Marseille, Rahim decided to pursue his passion and began to study film at the Paul Valéry University of Montpellier. His life as a film student was chronicled in a documentary by fellow Belfortain Cyril Mennegun titled "Tahar, student", aired on French TV channel France 5 in 2006.

Following this, Rahim moved to Paris in 2005 and studied drama at the Laboratoire de l'Acteur under Hélène Zidi-Chéruy while working in a factory during the week, and in a nightclub at weekends, to make ends meet.

Career
In mid-2006, after signing with an agent, Rahim won a part in the hit Canal+ television series La Commune written by Abdel Raouf Dafri. Dafri penned the first draft of the script to A Prophet. Rahim then met Audiard when the two coincidentally shared a cab while leaving a set. Rahim introduced himself saying that "I knew it was Audiard and I said I was a fan but I think I was a bit silly" and was afterward very surprised that Audiard remembered him enough to contact him about A Prophet. 

After a two-line appearance in the 2007 horror movie Inside starring Béatrice Dalle, he went through a gruelling three months of auditioning. After eight callbacks, he landed his breakthrough role.

Rahim also starred in controversial Chinese director Lou Ye's film Love and Bruises. The director, twice banned from making movies by the Chinese government, likely met Rahim at the 2009 Cannes Film Festival where they were each presenting Spring Fever and A Prophet respectively. Love and Bruises is the adaptation of the banned biography of Jie Liu Falin.

Another project he starred in was Free Men, the biopic about Si Kaddour Benghabrit, founder of the Great Mosque of Paris, directed by Ismaël Ferroukhi of Le Grand Voyage fame.

In 2015, he was selected to be on the jury for the Un Certain Regard section of the 2015 Cannes Film Festival and later starred in the European crime drama television series The Last Panthers.

In 2018, he appeared as Judas in the film Mary Magdalene, written by Helen Edmundson. In the U.S., he had a starring role as FBI agent Ali Soufan in The Looming Tower.

In 2021, he was nominated for a Golden Globe for portraying the role of Mohamedou Ould Salahi in The Mauritanian. Rahim also served as a jury member at the 74th Cannes Film Festival.

Rahim will next play Paul Barras in Ridley Scott's Napoleon, starring Joaquin Phoenix, in 2023 for Apple TV+. He will appear with Anne Hathaway in Rebecca Miller's upcoming film She Came to Me and in the Sony's Spider-Man Universe film Madame Web.

Personal life
Rahim is married to fellow French-Algerian actress Leïla Bekhti, whom he met while filming A Prophet in 2007. Together they are parents to a son, Souleymane, born in July 2017, a daughter, born in February 2020 and then an unexpected third child in 2021.

Filmography

Film

Television

Theatre
 2007 – 2008: Libres sont les papillons in the role of the blind character Benjamin. The play was written by Leonard Gershe, directed by Hélène Zidi-Chéruy and staged at the Côté Court Theater, 11th arrondissement of Paris.

Accolades

Notes

References

External links

 

1981 births
Living people
People from Belfort
Best Actor César Award winners
Most Promising Actor César Award winners
European Film Award for Best Actor winners
Best Actor Lumières Award winners
French male film actors
French male stage actors
French Muslims
French people of Arab descent
French people of Algerian descent
Male actors of Algerian descent
French male television actors
21st-century French male actors